Feyzabad (also Romanized as Feyẕābād and Feiz Abad) is a village in Fariman Rural District, in the Central District of Fariman County, Razavi Khorasan Province, Iran. At the 2006 census, its population was 401, in 101 families.

References 

Populated places in Fariman County